St. Brigid's National School is a primary national school for boys and girls. It is located off Beechpark Avenue in Castleknock, Fingal, Ireland. It has a Roman Catholic ethos.

Achievements
St. Brigids' choir has performed at several occasions, including on the radio in Famleigh in Christmas 2008. The choir has also entered various contests around Ireland, including the ESB Feis Ceoil in Dublin in which they placed first.

Notable former pupils
 Colin Farrell – actor 
 Sarah Hawkshaw – Ireland women's field hockey international

References

Castleknock
Catholic primary schools in the Republic of Ireland
Primary schools in Fingal
Educational institutions established in the 19th century
19th-century establishments in Ireland